Günter de Bruyn (1 November 1926 – 4 October 2020) was a German author.

Life
Günter de Bruyn was born in Berlin in November 1926; his father Carl was a Catholic from Bavaria. Günter served as a Luftwaffenhelfer and soldier in World War II.  Wounded, he was then held in custody by the United States as a prisoner of war; after his release he found a job as a farm worker in Hesse.  After his return to Berlin, he trained as a "new teacher" in Potsdam.  Until 1949 he worked as a teacher in a village near Rathenow in Brandenburg.

Subsequently, he trained as a librarian and worked at the Zentralinstitut für Bibliothekswesen (Central Institute for Library Knowledge) in East Berlin from 1953 to 1961.  Since 1961 de Bruyn has lived as a freelance writer.  From 1965 to 1978, he was a member of the Zentralvorstandes des Schriftstellerverbandes der DDR (Central Executive Committee of the Literary Association of East Germany); he was a member of the presidency of the PEN Centre of East Germany from 1974 to 1982.

In October 1989, Günter de Bruyn declined to accept the National Prize of East Germany.

De Bruyn later lived in the village of Görsdorf (part of the municipality of Tauche) in Brandenburg, as well as in Berlin.  He was a member of the German PEN Centre.

He died in October 2020 at the age of 93.

Literary activity
Günter de Bruyn's works range from the frequently autobiographically colored Realist novels and narratives which explain critiques of the private lives of the artists in East Germany to essays on literary science and historical themes, particularly Prussian history.

He edited a series of works from 18th and 19th century authors in Berlin and Brandenburg, which appear under the title Märkischer Dichtergarten.

He had great success in the 1990s with the two volumes of his autobiography, Zwischenbilanz and Vierzig Jahre.

Awards
 1964 Heinrich Mann Prize
 1981 Lion-Feuchtwanger-Preis
 1989 Thomas-Mann-Preis
 1990 Heinrich-Böll-Preis of the City of Cologne
 1991 Honorary degree of the University of Freiburg
 1993 Großer Literaturpreis der Bayerischen Akademie der Schönen Künste (Greater Literary Prize of the Bavarian Academy of Fine Arts)
 1994 Bundesverdienstkreuz of Germany
 1996 Literary Prize of the Konrad Adenauer Foundation
 1996 Literary Prize of the state of Brandenburg
 1997 Jean-Paul Prize
 1999 Honorary degree of the Humboldt University of Berlin
 1999 Fontane Prize of the City of Neuruppin
 2000 Ernst-Robert-Curtius-Preis for essays; Friedrich-Schiedel-Literaturpreis
 2005 Order of Merit of Brandenburg
 2006 Jacob Grimm German Language Prize
 2007 Gleim Literary Prize
 2007 Hanns Martin Schleyer Prize
 2008 Hoffmann von Fallersleben Prize
 2009 Max-Herrmann-Preis
 2011 Johann-Heinrich-Merck-Preis

Works
 Über die Arbeit in Freihandbibliotheken, Berlin 1957
 Hochzeit in Weltzow, Halle (Saale) 1960
 Wiedersehen an der Spree, Halle (Saale) 1960
 Einführung in die Systematik für allgemeinbildende Bibliotheken, Berlin 1961
 Der Hohlweg, Halle (Saale) 1963
 Ein schwarzer, abgrundtiefer See, Halle (Saale) 1963
 Maskeraden, Halle (Saale) 1966
 Buridans Esel, Halle (Saale) 1968 (first published in 1963 in «Sinn und Form»)
 Preisverleihung, Halle (Saale) 1972
 Tristan und Isolde, Berlin 1975
 Das Leben des Jean Paul Friedrich Richter, Halle (Saale) 1975
 Märkische Forschungen, Halle (Saale) et al. 1978
 Im Querschnitt, Halle (Saale) et al. 1979
 Babylon, Leipzig 1980
 Neue Herrlichkeit, Frankfurt am Main 1984
 Lesefreuden, Frankfurt am Main 1986
 Frauendienst, Halle (Saale) et al. 1986
 Brandenburg, München et al. 1991 (with Hauke Dressler)
 Im Spreeland, Freiburg im Breisgau 1991 (with Erhard Pansegrau)
 Jubelschreie, Trauergesänge, Frankfurt am Main 1991
 Zwischenbilanz, Frankfurt am Main 1992
 Mein Brandenburg, Frankfurt am Main 1993 (with Barbara Klemm)
 Das erzählte Ich, Frankfurt am Main 1995
 Was ich noch schreiben will, Göttingen 1995 (with Ingo Hermann)
 Irritation und Verstehen, Stuttgart 1995
 Vierzig Jahre, Frankfurt am Main 1996
 Altersbetrachtungen über den alten Fontane, Berlin 1999
 Die Finckensteins, Berlin 1999
 Deutsche Zustände, Frankfurt am Main 1999
 Preußens Luise. Vom Entstehen und Vergehen einer Legende, Berlin 2001 (on the legacy of Louise of Mecklenburg-Strelitz, Queen consort of Prussia)
 Unzeitgemäßes, Frankfurt am Main 2001
 Unter den Linden, Berlin 2003
 Abseits. Liebeserklärungen an eine Landschaft. Mit Fotos von Rüdiger Südhoff, Frankfurt am Main 2005
 Als Poesie gut. Schicksale aus Berlins Kunstepoche 1786 bis 1807. Frankfurt am Main 2006
 Die Zeit der schweren Not: Schicksale aus dem Kulturleben Berlins 1807 bis 1815, S. Fischer, Frankfurt am Main 2010, . E-Book 
 Gräfin Elisa. Eine Lebens- und Liebesgeschichte, S. Fischer, Frankfurt am Main 2012, . E-Book 

Editorial work
 Das Lästerkabinett, Leipzig 1970
 Jean Paul: Leben des Quintus Fixlein, Berlin 1976
 Theodor Gottlieb von Hippel: Über die Ehe, Berlin 1979
 Friedrich de la Motte Fouqué: Ritter und Geister, Berlin 1980 (Märkischer Dichtergarten)
 Friedrich Wilhelm August Schmidt: Einfalt und Natur, Berlin 1981 (Märkischer Dichtergarten)
 Christoph Friedrich Nicolai: Vertraute Briefe von Adelheid B. an ihre Freundin Julie S. Freuden des jungen Werthers, Berlin 1982 (Märkischer Dichtergarten)
 Ludwig Tieck: Die männliche Mutter und andere Liebes-,Lebens-, Spott- und Schauergeschichten, Berlin 1983 (Märkischer Dichtergarten)
 Rahel Levin: Rahels erste Liebe, Berlin 1985 (Märkischer Dichtergarten)
 Ernst Theodor Amadeus Hoffmann: Gespenster in der Friedrichstadt, Berlin 1986 (Märkischer Dichtergarten)
 Theodor Fontane: Die schönsten Wanderungen durch die Mark Brandenburg, Berlin 1988 (Märkischer Dichtergarten)
 Friedrich August Ludwig von der Marwitz: Nachrichten aus meinem Leben, Berlin 1989 (Märkischer Dichtergarten)
 Friedrichshagen und seine Dichter. Arkadien in Preußen, Berlin 1992 (Märkischer Dichtergarten)
 Moritz Heimann: Die Mark, wo sie am märkischsten ist, Berlin 1996 (Märkischer Dichtergarten)

Film adaptations
 1978: Hochzeit in Weltzow 1980: , based on Buridans Esel 1981: Märkische ForschungenFurther reading
 Günter de Bruyn, edited by Heinz Ludwig Arnold. Ed. Text + Kritik, München 1995
 Günter de Bruyn in perspective, ed. by Dennis Tate. Rodopi, Amsterdam 1999
 Günter de Bruyn. Materialien zu Leben und Werk, edited by Uwe Wittstock. Fischer-Taschenbuch-Verlag, Frankfurt am Main 1991
 Owen Evans: Ein Training im Ich-Sagen. Personal authenticity in the prose work of Günter de Bruyn, Lang, Bern et al. 1996. (= European university studies; Ser. 1, German language and literature; 1580)
 Marga Firle: Erzählen als Sprachhandlung in der poetischen Kommunikation. Untersuchungen zum Kommentieren in den "Märkischen Forschungen" von Günter de Bruyn, Akad. d. Wiss. d. DDR, Zentralinst. f. Sprachwiss., Berlin 1987. (= Linguistische Studien/A; 167)
 Magdalena Grams: Das künstlerische Wirklichkeitsverhältnis Günter de Bryuns. Dargestellt an Figurenwahl, Konfliktgestaltung und Erzählweise seiner ausgewählten Prosawerke, Univ. Diss. A, Leipzig 1988.
 Frank Hafner: "Heimat" in der sozialistischen Gesellschaft. Der Wandel des DDR-Bildes im Werk Günter de Bruyns, Lang, Frankfurt am Main et al. 1992. (= Münchener Studien zur literarischen Kultur in Deutschland; 13)
 Karin Hirdina: Günter de Bruyn. Leben und Werk, Verlag Das Europ. Buch, Westberlin 1983
 Anja Kreutzer: Untersuchen zur Poetik Günter de Bruyns, Lang, Frankfurt am Main et al. 1995. (= Beiträge zur Literatur und Literaturwissenschaft des 20. Jahrhunderts; 12)
 Lutz Kube: Zwischen "Heimat" Brandenburg und Sozialismus, UMI, Ann Arbor, MI 2005.
 Domenico Mugnolo: Günter de Bruyn narratore, 2. ed. Univ. di Trento, Dipartimento di Storia della Civiltà Europea, Trento 1993. (= Ricerche di germanistica; 3)
 Marcel Reich-Ranicki: Entgegnung: Zur deutschen Literatur der siebziger Jahre. Dt. Verlag-Anst., Stuttgart 1979
 Peter K. Stein: Literaturgeschichte, Rezeptionsforschung, "produktive Rezeption". Ein Versuch unter mediävistischem Aspekt anhand von Beobachtungen zu Günter de Bruyns Nachdichtung von Gottfrieds von Strassburg "Tristan" im Kontext der wissenschaftlichen und kulturpolitischen Situation in der DDR, Kümmerle, Göppingen 1979. (= Göppinger Arbeiten zur Germanistik; 287)

References

External links
Literature by and on Günter de Bruyn in the catalog of the German National Library 
Commentated Link Collection by the University Library at the Free University of Berlin 
Märkische Musenhöfe: Günter de Bruyn 
   

1926 births
2020 deaths
Commanders Crosses of the Order of Merit of the Federal Republic of Germany
East German writers
German male writers
Luftwaffenhelfer
Heinrich Mann Prize winners
Members of the Academy of Arts, Berlin
Writers from Berlin
German prisoners of war in World War II held by the United States
German military personnel of World War II